Athanasios or Thanasoulas Valtinos was a Greek revolutionary of the Greek War of Independence.

Biography 
He was born in 1801 or 1802 in Messolonghi to a well-known revolutionist family, originating from Valtos Province. His father Ioannis was a servant of Ali Pasha. For this reason the infant Thanasoulas was thrown into a river by Kostas Lepeniotis, but was saved by some women and raised at the court of Ali Pasha, who gave him one of most renowned figures of the modern Greek Enlightenment, Athanasios Psalidas, as his tutor. 

Upon adulthood, Valtinos entered Ali Pasha's court until the latter's death. He was then held prisoner by the Ottomans in Ioannina until 1824. Then he was sent to Arta and on a secret mission on behalf of Omer Vrioni, but Valtinos instead joined Georgios Karaiskakis' army, supporting the rebel Greeks. Later, when Karaiskakis was killed, he joined the army of Demetrios Ypsilantis, fighting until the end of the Greek War of Independence, in 1829. Since 1855 he was aide-de-camp to King Otto, and followed him in his exile in Germany. He later returned to Athens where he died in 1870 or 1877.

Sources 

1801 births
1870s deaths
Greek people of the Greek War of Independence
People from Missolonghi
Prisoners and detainees of the Ottoman Empire
Ali Pasha of Ioannina